Stadion an der Kreuzeiche is a multi-use stadium in Reutlingen, Germany. It is used mostly for football matches and is the home stadium of SSV Reutlingen. The stadium is able to hold 15,228 people and was opened in 1953.

References

Kreuzeiche
Reutlingen
Sports venues in Baden-Württemberg
Buildings and structures in Reutlingen (district)
Sport in Tübingen (region)